Ronald Jonker (born 14 December 1944) is an Australian former cyclist. He competed in the individual road race at the 1968 Summer Olympics.

References

External links
 

1944 births
Living people
Australian male cyclists
Olympic cyclists of Australia
Cyclists at the 1968 Summer Olympics
Place of birth missing (living people)
Commonwealth Games medallists in cycling
Commonwealth Games gold medallists for Australia
Cyclists at the 1970 British Commonwealth Games
20th-century Australian people
21st-century Australian people
Medallists at the 1970 British Commonwealth Games